Emma Rice (born 1967) is a British theatre director.

Emma Rice may also refer to: 
 Emma Rice (actress), British actress who starred in Cradle of Fear
 The married name of Emma Bridgewater who founded the British ceramics manufacturer Emma Bridgewater